Ian Bushie is a Canadian politician, who was elected to the Legislative Assembly of Manitoba in the 2019 Manitoba general election. He represents the electoral district of Keewatinook as a member of the Manitoba New Democratic Party.

He is a member of the Hollow Water First Nation, and was a candidate for the leadership of the Assembly of Manitoba Chiefs in 2008.

References

New Democratic Party of Manitoba MLAs
First Nations politicians
Ojibwe people
Living people
21st-century Canadian politicians
Year of birth missing (living people)